Sidi Amar is a town in north-eastern Algeria.

Communes of Annaba Province

fr:Sidi Amar